Sally Quinlan (born May 20, 1961) is an American professional golfer who played on the LPGA Tour.

Quinlan was runner-up in the 1983 U.S. Women's Amateur. She won once on the LPGA Tour in 1984.

Professional wins

LPGA Tour wins (1)

References

External links

American female golfers
LPGA Tour golfers
University of Miami alumni
1961 births
Living people
21st-century American women